George Allan was a Scottish footballer who played for Leven Thistle, Partick Thistle and Hamilton Academical, as a wing half or inside forward.

Allan joined Partick from Leven Thistle on 22 December 1897. He made his debut against Heart of Midlothian in a 6–2 loss on 25 December the same year. He played his final game for the club on 3 May 1899 in a 4–0 loss against Queen's Park in the Glasgow League. Overall, he made at least 22 appearances and scored 6 goals for the club in all competitions (11 and 6 in the Scottish Football League).

Allan then joined Hamilton, making his Accies debut on 16 September 1899 at home in a friendly against the Kaffirs from Transvaal. Overall, he made 31 appearances for Hamilton (21 in the league) across two seasons, and did not score.

References

Scottish footballers
Association football wing halves
Association football inside forwards
Scottish Football League players
Partick Thistle F.C. players
Hamilton Academical F.C. players
Year of birth missing
19th-century births
Year of death missing
20th-century deaths